Övertorneå is a locality and the seat of Övertorneå Municipality in Norrbotten County, Sweden with 1,917 inhabitants in 2010.

It is located at the shore of the Torne River, opposite to their Finnish twin town Ylitornio. Övertorneå means "Upper Torneå", based on a division of the Torneå parish in two parts in the 16th century. Until the border between Sweden and Finland was drawn at the Torne River in 1809, the two villages on both sides of the river were one. From 1809 till 1917, this represented the Swedish border to Russia.

Gallery

Sports
Övertorneå is home of NHL forward Linus Omark.  Another well known ice-hockey player from the settlement is Daniel Henriksson.

The following sports clubs are located in Övertorneå:

 Övertorneå SK

Notable residents
 Mathilda Fogman (1835-1921), a Swedish and Finnish midwife, was an influential spiritual leader within Laestadianism in Övertorneå.
 Brita Klemetintytär (1621-1700) lived in Övertorneå, where she followed in her father's footsteps and served as postmaster.

External links

References 

Municipal seats of Norrbotten County
Swedish municipal seats
Populated places in Övertorneå Municipality
Norrbotten
Finland–Sweden border crossings